Glenn Leopold is an American writer and musician. He worked for Hanna-Barbera as a story editor, writer, character creator, and show developer. He is also a member of the music band, Gunhill Road.

Screenwriting credits

Television
(series head writer denoted in bold)
CB Bears (1977)
Dinky Dog (1978)
Yogi's Space Race (1978)
The All-New Popeye Hour (1978-1981)
Buford and the Galloping Ghost (1979)
Godzilla (1979)
The New Fred and Barney Show (1979)
The New Shmoo (1979)
Scooby and Scrappy Doo (1979)
Drak Pack (1980)
The Flintstone Comedy Show (1980)
The Smurfs (1981-1989)
 Benji, Zax & the Alien Prince (1983)
Lucky Luke (1983)
Shirt Tales (1983)
The New Scooby and Scrappy-Doo Show (1983-1984)
Super Friends (1984-1985)
Pink Panther and Sons (1984-1986)
Snorks (1985)
The 13 Ghosts of Scooby-Doo (1985)
The Jetsons (1985)
Paw Paws (1986)
The New Adventures of Jonny Quest (1986)
Small Wonder (1987)
Throb (1987)
Gravedale High (1990)
The Pirates of Dark Water (1991-1993)
SWAT Kats: The Radical Squadron (1993-1995)
Biker Mice from Mars (1995)
Dumb and Dumber (1995)
Fantastic Four (1995)
The Hot Rod Dogs and Cool Car Cats (1995)
The Real Adventures of Jonny Quest (1996-1997)
Adventures from the Book of Virtues (1996-1998)
Doug (1998-1999)
Sabrina: The Animated Series (1999)
Kong: The Animated Series (2000)
Capertown Cops (2000)
Ultimate Book of Spells (2001)
Alien Racers (2005)
Zorro: Generation Z (2006)
Biker Mice from Mars (2007)
Dork Hunters from Outer Space (2008)
Pac-Man and the Ghostly Adventures (2013)

Films
The Prowler (1981)
Too Scared to Scream (1985)
Scooby-Doo and the Ghoul School (1988)
The Adventures of Ronald McDonald: McTreasure Island (1990)
The Town Santa Forgot (1993)
A Flintstones Christmas Carol (1994)
Scooby-Doo! in Arabian Nights (1994)
Scooby-Doo on Zombie Island (1998)
Scooby-Doo! and the Witch's Ghost (1999)
Scooby-Doo and the Alien Invaders (2000)

As character creator
The Smurfs (Clockwork Smurf, Clockwork Smurfette)
The Real Adventures of Jonny Quest (Ezekiel Rage) [3]

Awards
Leopold received a 1994 Emmy nomination for The Town that Santa Forgot.

Music
Glenn Leopold was also a member of the American band Gunhill Road, along with Steven Goldrich and Gil Roman. The band is most famous for their 1973 hit single, “Back When My Hair Was Short.”

References

External links

IMDB bio
questfan.com

Year of birth missing (living people)
Living people
American television writers
American male television writers
Hanna-Barbera people